Iran Ajr, formerly known as the Arya Rakhsh, was a Japanese-built landing craft used by Iran to lay naval mines during the Iran–Iraq War. Built in 1978, the 614-ton, 54-meter ship was powered by two diesel engines and featured a bow ramp for unloading cargo. She was scuttled in 1987.

Iran–Iraq War
On 21 September 1987, U.S. forces involved in Operation Prime Chance – the covert part of Operation Earnest Will, the mission to protect U.S.-flagged petroleum-carrying ships in the Persian Gulf – tracked Iran Ajr and dispatched United States Army helicopters from the United States Navy guided-missile frigate  to shadow her. When the aviators reported that people aboard Iran Ajr were laying mines, the U.S. commander in the Persian Gulf ordered the pilots to "stop the mining." The helicopters fired on the ship, killing some of the crewmen and chasing others into the water. A team of United States Navy SEAL commandos later boarded the ship, confirmed the presence of mines, and detained the surviving Iranians. On 26 September, EOD MU5 Detachment 5 scuttled the ship in international waters.

When the U.S. Navy guided-missile frigate  struck a mine in the Persian Gulf in April 1988, U.S. Navy explosive ordnance specialists matched the serial numbers of nearby unexploded mines to the ones aboard Iran Ajr. This evidence of Iranian involvement in the mining of Samuel B. Roberts led to the biggest surface-warfare naval battle since World War II, the retribution campaign of 18 April 1988 called Operation Praying Mantis.

The captured colors of Iran Ajr are in the U.S. Navy Museum.

References

Further reading

External links
The attack on the Iran Ajr
Another narration of the attack
Photos of the captured Iran Ajr and its detainees aboard U.S. Navy warships

Amphibious warfare vessels of Japan
Minelayers of Japan
Amphibious warfare vessels of the Islamic Republic of Iran Navy
Ships built in Japan
1978 ships
Iran–Japan relations
Minelayers of the Islamic Republic of Iran Navy
Operations involving special forces
United States Navy in the 20th century
Iran–United States relations
Shipwrecks in the Persian Gulf
Maritime incidents in 1987
Vessels captured by the United States Navy
Iran–Iraq War naval ships of Iran
Scuttled vessels